Following are lists of pianists:

 List of classical pianists
 List of classical pianists (recorded)
 List of jazz pianists
 List of pop and rock pianists
 List of ragtime pianist
 List of women classical pianists

 
Lists of musicians by instrument